Your Face Sounds Familiar is a Greek reality show which aired on ANT1. The third season premiered on April 3, 2016 and at the end of every live, the winner of the night was donating the money from the audience's voting (via phone) to a charity of their choice. In Cyprus, the money were given to "Pankypria Organosi Tyflon" (Pancyprian Organization of the Blind People) organization every week.

Cast

Host and Judges 
The host of the show was Maria Bekatorou and all four judges were replaced by Katerina Papoutsaki, Petros Philippidis, Stamatis Fasoulis and Nikos Moutsinas.

Contestants 
There were ten contestants in total who competed in the third season; five women and five men. Apostolia Zoi first signed to participate on the second series of the show, but cancelled her participation due to personal reasons. Zoi revealed this in an interview with "Ego Weekly" Magazine, during her participation on the show.

Performances

Week 1 
The premiere aired on April 3, 2016 and winner of the first live was Valandis with 24 points. Valandis chose to give the money from the audience voting to the organization "Women Without Borders" in Rhodes.

After the judges and contestants' scores, Apostolia and Josephine were tied with 36 points. Philippidis, who was the president of the judges for the week, chose to give the final 8 points to Apostolia and the 7 points to Josephine. After the combined final scores, two contestants had 13 points and other two had 21 points. In each tie, the one who got the highest score from the audience got the highest final place and the one with the lowest got the lowest place.

Week 2 
The second episode aired on April 10, 2016 and the winner was Dimos with 24 points. Dimos chose to give the money from the audience voting to Thalassemia Department, Hagia Sophia.

After the judges and contestants' scores, Valeria and Eleni were tied with 22 points, Valandis and Othonas with 25 points and Giannis and Mathildi with 48 points. Moutsinas, who was the president of the judges for the week, chose to give the final 3 points to Valeria and the 4 points to Eleni, the final 5 points to Valandis and the 6 points to Othonas and the final 10 points to Mathildi and the 11 to Giannis. After the combined final scores, four contestants had 11 points. In tie, the one who got the highest score from the audience got the highest final place, the one with the second highest score from the audience the second highest final place and so on.

Week 3
The third episode aired on April 17, 2016 and the winner was Mathildi with 24 points. Mathildi chose to give the money from the audience voting to the "Rehabilitation Center for Children" at Voula.

The Secret Guest of the evening was Isaias Matiaba, who transformed into Adele and sang "Hello".

Week 4
The fourth episode aired on April 24, 2016 and the winner was Othonas with 23 points. Othonas chose to give the money from the audience voting to the Panhellenic Association of Transplanted Hearts and Lungs, "I Skytali" at Nea Smyrni.

After the judges and contestants' scores, Apostolia and Josephine were tied with 43 points. Fasoulis, who was the president of the judges for the week, chose to give the final 9 points to Apostolia and the 10 points to Josephine. After the combined final scores, three contestants had 12 points. In tie, the one who got the highest score from the audience got the highest final place, the one with the second highest score from the audience the second highest final place and the one with the third highest score from the audience the last final place of the three.

The Secret Guest of the evening was Mary Sinatsaki, who transformed into Eleni Foureira and sang "Reggaeton".

Week 5: Eurovision Night
Few days before the live show, one of the contestants (Metaxas) was transmitted to the hospital and diagnosed with gallstone. Metaxas followed conservative treatment and did not have to have any surgical procedure. The incident did not affect his performance on the show, since he returned and performed live on May 8, 2016.

The fifth episode aired on May 8, 2016 and the winner was Apostolia with 24 points. Apostolia chose to give the money from the audience voting to the non-profit organization "I Kivotos tou Kosmou".

After the judges and contestants' scores, Josephine, Dimos and Othonas were tied with 20 points. Papoutsaki, who was the president of the judges for the week, chose to give the final 4 points to Othonas, the 5 points Josephine and the 6 points to Dimos. After the combined final scores, there were three ties; two contestants tied with 19 points, two contestants with 17 points and two contestants with 11 points. In tie, the one who got the highest score from the audience got the highest final place and the one with the second highest score from the audience the second highest final place in each tie respectively.

The Secret Guest of the evening was Costas Doxas, who transformed into Peggy Zina and sang Zina's entry in 2002 Greek Final, "Love Is A Wonderful Thing". Doxas was the runner-up of the second series of the show. Also, Dafni Bokota was a guest judge of the evening commenting on the contestants' performances, but she did not score them at the end.

Week 6
The sixth episode aired on May 15, 2016 and the winner was Dimos with 24 points. Dimos chose to give the money from the audience voting to Thalassemia Department, Hagia Sophia.

After the combined final scores, two contestants had 13 points. The one who got the highest score from the audience got the highest final place and the one with the lowest got the lowest place.

The Secret Guest of the evening was Melina Makris, who transformed into Lady Gaga and sang "Poker Face".

Week 7
The seventh episode aired on May 22, 2016 and the winner was Apostolia with 23 points. Apostolia chose to give the money from the audience voting to the non-profit organization "I Kivotos tou Kosmou".

After the combined final scores, there were three ties; three contestants tied with 18 points, two contestants with 14 points and two contestants with 9 points. In each tie, the one who got the highest score from the audience got the highest final place, the one with the second highest score from the audience the second highest final place and so on.

Due to the parliamentary elections, the show was not broadcast live in Cyprus and Cypriots were not able to vote for this week.

Week 8
The eighth episode aired on May 29, 2016 and the winner was Stamatis with 24 points. Stamatis chose to give the money from the audience voting to the non-profit organization "Paidia tis Gis".

After the combined final scores, there was a tie with four contestants getting 16 points. The one who got the highest score from the audience got the highest final place, the one with the second highest score from the audience the second highest final place and so on.

Week 9
The ninth episode aired on June 5, 2016 and the winner was Eleni with 24 points. Eleni chose to give the money from the audience voting to the society club "Pisti".

After the combined final scores, there was a tie with two contestants getting 13 points. The one who got the highest score from the audience got the highest final place and the one with the second highest score from the audience the second highest final place.

Week 10
The tenth episode aired on June 12, 2016 and the winner was Mathildi with 24 points. Mathildi chose to give the money from the audience voting to the "Rehabilitation Center for Children" at Voula.

After the judges and contestants' scores, Apostolia and Valeria were tied with 28 points. Fasoulis, who was the president of the judges for the week, chose to give the final 7 points to Valeria and the 6 points to Apostolia.

Week 11: Semi-finals
The eleventh episode aired on June 19, 2016 and the winner was Apostolia with 24 points. Apostolia chose to give the money from the audience voting to the non-profit organization "I Kivotos tou Kosmou".

After the combined final scores, there were three ties; two contestants tied with 21 points, two with 12 points and two with 11 points. In each tie, the one who got the highest score from the audience got the highest final place and the one with the second highest score from the audience the second highest final place.

In the semi-finals, the four contestants with the highest cumulative scores from all 11 weeks were announced and were the ones to compete in the finals. The four finalists were; Mathildi Maggira with 207 points, Dimos Beke with 192 points, Giannis Kritikos with 184 points and Apostolia Zoi with 174 points. The remaining six players will perform in duets but they will not get scored. It was also the last time the judges were going to score the contestants since the winner is decided only by the audience.

Week 12: Finals
The twelfth and final live aired on June 26, 2016 and the winner of the show was Giannis Kritikos. The income from the audience voting for the final, was divided in ten equal parts and was given to all ten foundations that the contestants were representing during the twelve live shows.

At the beginning of the show, Bekatorou performed the songs "Roz Bikini" and "Pame Gia Trelles Stis Seychelles" by Polina. During her performance, Polina herself joined her and continued performing together.

The six contestants who did not compete in the finals, received a special award for their participation on the show.

Notes
 1.  The points that judges gave in order (Moutsinas, Papoutsaki, Fasoulis, Philippidis).
 2.  Each contestant gave 5 points to a contestant of their choice.
 3.  Total of both extra and judges' score.
 4.  Result of both extra and judges' score.
 5.  In the final, only the audience voted for the winner and the one with the most votes won the competition.

Results chart 

 indicates the contestant came first that week.
 indicates the contestant came last that week.
 performed but didn't score
 indicates the winning contestant.
 indicates the runner-up contestant.
 indicates the third-place contestant.
 indicates the fourth-place contestant.

Ratings

References

Greek 3
2016 Greek television seasons